Roma come Chicago (literally "Rome like Chicago") is a 1968 Italian crime film directed by Alberto De Martino. It stars John Cassavetes.

Cast
 John Cassavetes as Mario Corda
 Gabriele Ferzetti as Commissioner
 Anita Sanders as Lea Corda
 Nikos Kourkoulos as Enrico
 Riccardo Cucciolla as Vice-Commissioner Pascuttini
 Luigi Pistilli as Colangeli
 Osvaldo Ruggieri as Inspector Sernesi
 Guido Lollobrigida as Angelo Scotese
 Piero Morgia as Carlo Taddei
 Marc Fiorini as Luciano Tarquini

Production
Among the films crew is cinematographer Aldo Tonto who had worked with Federico Fellini and Roberto Rossellini. The score was composed by Ennio Morricone and Bruno Nicolai. Morricone and Nicolai's score was re-worked music from the 1968 TV show Musica da sera. Alberto De Martino spoke about working with John Cassavetes, stating that he was "the most difficult actor I have ever worked with. When we first met, his wife Gena Rowlands came too. He introduced me to her as "the 
most intelligent  director in Europe" which she responded with "Give him time!" Both De Martino and Cassavetes argued on the set but according to De Martino, the two ended production on good terms.

Roma come Chicago was shot at De Laurentiis studios and on location in Rome. Director Alberto De Martino discussed the film's location as an "Americanized Rome".

Release
Roma come Chicago was released in Italy on 20 November 1968 where it was distributed by Paramount – De Laurentiis. It grossed a total of 320.84 million lira on its theatrical run in Italy. As of 2013, the film has not been released on home video.

Reception
A review in the Monthly Film Bulletin stated that the film was a "fairly literal imitation of the American location thrillers of the Forties and Fifties made by Hathaway, Siodmak and others, except that it is a little more calculated in its violence."

See also
 John Cassavetes filmography
List of crime films of the 1960s
List of Italian films of 1968

Notes

References

External links
 

1968 films
1960s Italian-language films
Films scored by Ennio Morricone
Films directed by Alberto De Martino
1968 crime films
Italian gangster films
Films shot in Rome
Films set in Rome
Films produced by Dino De Laurentiis
1960s Italian films